Scenic World is a private, family-owned tourist attraction located in Katoomba in the Blue Mountains, New South Wales, Australia, about 100 kilometres west of Sydney. Scenic World is home to four attractions, the Scenic Railway, the Scenic Skyway, the Scenic Cableway and Scenic Walkway a 2.4 km elevated boardwalk through ancient rainforest.

Overview

Railway
The Scenic Railway is an incline railway now used for tourism. It was originally constructed for a coal and oil shale mining operation in the Jamison Valley in the 1880s, in order to haul the coal and shale from the valley floor up to the escarpment above. From 1928 to 1945, it carried coal during the week and passengers at weekends. The coal mine was closed in 1945 after which it remained as a tourist attraction. The Scenic Railway was temporarily closed on 13 January 2013 (although the Skyway, Cableway, and Walkway remained open) as construction to upgrade both tracks and carriages began. The work was completed and the railway reopened in April 2013. The Scenic Railway makes many claims to be the steepest passenger railway, the steepest funicular, and the steepest incline in the world. 
However the railway uses a winch system and no counterbalancing carriage, therefore it is an inclined lift rather than a funicular.
 the steepest true funicular is the Stoosbahn in Switzerland.

Skyway 
Built in 1958, the Scenic Skyway is another cable-driven conveyance at Scenic World. The original Scenic Skyway was withdrawn on 4 April 2004 after 587,401 crossings and now sits in the picnic area at Scenic World. It was replaced by a new cabin in December of the same year. The new Skyway was built by Doppelmayr and CWA Constructions, and features a 72-person cabin with sections of liquid crystal glass that turns a raised section of the floor transparent as the ride progresses. In November 2005, a second station on the opposite cliff-face opened, allowing Skyway passengers to disembark and follow bush walking trails to the nearby Echo Point.
In November 2017, the latest Scenic Skyway cabin was launched. This Skyway cabin is 30% bigger than its predecessor, offering visitors a more spacious ride with easier boarding, as well as free Wi-Fi.

Cableway

Like the redevelopment of the Railway and Skyway, the Cableway had a replacement of its cabin in 2018.

Dining 
Scenic World operates two food and beverage outlets, namely EATS270 and the Terrace Café.

The former Scenic Revolving Restaurant was renovated and reopened in late 2012 as an eatery. During this time, a decision was made to cease operation of the revolving floor. The floor can still, however, be turned on by request for private functions. Both EATS270 and the Terrace Café feature balcony areas with extensive outdoor seating overlooking the Three Sisters and Jamison Valley.

Scenic World food and beverage outlets are not open in the evenings for general dining, but can be booked for private functions and corporate events.

Orphan Rocker 
In 1984, Scenic World began building a roller coaster known as the Orphan Rocker, named after the nearby Orphan Rock. This is the first roller coaster to be completely designed and manufactured in Australia. The highlight of this ride is meant to be a swooping banked turn that takes riders within metres of the edge of a  cliff. It has in the past been referred to as a "sitdown suspended" coaster, because although it is a conventional sitdown coaster, the trains can tilt from side to side, like a suspended coaster, giving it its name. It was originally planned as a scenic monorail ride, but it soon evolved into a roller-coaster ride. The roller coaster has never publicly opened due to demands for redevelopment elsewhere onsite. Visitation to Scenic World in the 1980s was increasing rapidly, mostly due to increased numbers of Japanese visitors, necessitating additional access into the valley and the idea for Scenic World's third ride, The Cableway (originally Scenicscender), was born.

Portions of the coaster's track have been removed as of 2017.

See also
List of funicular railways

References

Further reading
 Shale Tramways of Katoomba Luxton, John R. Australian Railway Historical Society Bulletin, January 1962 ARHS Bulletin search at nswrail.net

External links

 Blue Mountains virtual video tour. including aerial footage over scenic world
 Scenic World website

Entertainment venues in New South Wales
Transport buildings and structures in New South Wales
Buildings and structures with revolving restaurants
Funicular railways in Australia
Tourist attractions in the Blue Mountains (New South Wales)
Katoomba, New South Wales